Erkki Olavi Pakkanen (19 April 1930 – 23 April 1973) was an amateur lightweight boxer from  Finland who won a bronze medal at the 1952 Olympics.

Pakkanen took up boxing in 1947 and won the Finnish junior title in 1949. He never held a senior national title, and qualified for the Helsinki Olympics by winning the Olympic trials. At the Olympics, he lost in a semifinal to the eventual winner Aureliano Bolognesi. Earlier in 1950 he seriously injured his right hand. The injury recurred in 1953 forcing Pakkanen to retire from boxing. He later ran a taxi company that he founded in 1958. Shortly after his 43rd birthday, Pakkanen died of a heart attack at a horse racing track while watching his son Jarmo competing. In 2008 he was inducted into the Finnish Boxing Hall of Fame.

1952 Olympic results
Below are the results of Erkki Pakkenen, a Finnish lightweight boxer who competed at the 1952 Helsinki Olympics:

 Round of 32: bye
 Round of 16: defeated Petros Nazarbegian (Iran) by decision, 3-0
 Quarterfinal: defeated Vicente Matute (Venezuela) by decision, 3-0
 Semifinal: lost to Aureliano Bolognesi (Italy) by decision, 0-3 (was awarded bronze medal)

References

1930 births
1973 deaths
People from Elimäki
Olympic boxers of Finland
Olympic bronze medalists for Finland
Boxers at the 1952 Summer Olympics
Olympic medalists in boxing
Finnish male boxers
Medalists at the 1952 Summer Olympics
Lightweight boxers
Sportspeople from Kymenlaakso